Roundel is a periodical that serves as the newsletter of the BMW Car Club of America. Their mission is to inform, entertain, and promote a sense of community for their 75,000 members. They review new cars as well as perform comparison tests. There is a classified ads section which has a large selection of BMWs.

The headquarters of Roundel was first in Cambridge, Massachusetts. Later it was moved to in Greer, South Carolina. The magazine presumably takes its name from the fact that the BMW logo is a roundel.

In 2020, the magazine was renamed BMW Car Club Magazine: Roundel, and is published ten times a year. It is joined biannually by BMW Car Club Magazine: BimmerLife.

References

External links
Online Version
Roundel Masthead
Car Key Duplication

Automobile magazines published in the United States
Monthly magazines published in the United States
Greenville, South Carolina
Magazines with year of establishment missing
Magazines published in South Carolina
Magazines published in Boston
Ten times annually magazines